Color Classics are a series of animated short films produced by Fleischer Studios for Paramount Pictures from 1934 to 1941 as a competitor to Walt Disney's Silly Symphonies. As the name implies, all of the shorts were made in color format, with the first entry of the series, Poor Cinderella (1934), being the first color cartoon produced by the Fleischer studio. There were 36 shorts produced in this series.

History
The first Color Classic was photographed with the two-color Cinecolor process. The rest of the 1934 and 1935 cartoons were filmed in two-color Technicolor, because the Disney studio had an exclusive agreement with Technicolor that prevented other studios from using the lucrative three-strip process. That exclusive contract expired during September 1935, and the 1936 Color Classic cartoon Somewhere in Dreamland (1936) became the first Fleischer cartoon produced with three-strip Technicolor.

The first cartoon in the series, Poor Cinderella, featured Betty Boop (with red hair and turquoise eyes); future shorts usually did not have familiar or recurring characters.

Many of the Color Classics entries make prominent use of Max Fleischer's Stereoptical process, a device which allowed animation cels to be photographed against actual 3 dimensional background sets instead of the traditional paintings. Poor Cinderella, Somewhere in Dreamland, and Christmas Comes But Once a Year all make prominent use of the technique. Disney's competing apparatus, the multiplane camera, would not be completed until 1937, three years after the Stereoptical Process's first use.  The Color Classics series ended in 1941 with Vitamin Hay, featuring characters Hunky and Spunky. A similar series would be started by Fleischer's successor Famous Studios during 1943, with the name Noveltoons.

Later statuses
During 1955, Paramount sold all rights to the Color Classics cartoons to television distributor U.M. & M. TV Corporation  U.M. & M. altered the original beginning credits sequences for some of the shorts, to remove all references to the names "Paramount Pictures" and "Technicolor", and to add their own copyright notices. Before the retitling could be finished, U.M. & M. was bought by National Telefilm Associates (NTA). Instead of refilming the openings, NTA obscured the references to the Paramount and Technicolor names by placing black bars over the original title cards and copyright notices. Only a few Color Classics had their title cards redone by U.M. & M., among them Greedy Humpty Dumpty, Play Safe, Christmas Comes But Once a Year, Bunny Mooning, Little Lambkins, and  Vitamin Hay.

NTA distributed the Color Classics to television, yet allowed the copyrights on all of the shorts to lapse except The Tears of an Onion.  Many public domain video distributors have released television prints of Color Classics shorts for home video.  The UCLA Film and Television Archive has, through the assistance of Republic Pictures (successor company to U.M. & M. and NTA), retained original theatrical copies of all of the shorts, which have periodically been shown in revival movie houses and by cable television.

Ironically, original distributor Paramount has, through their 1999 acquisition of Republic, regained ownership of the Color Classics, including the original elements. Olive Films (current licensee for Republic, and which currently has home video rights) has, to date, not announced any plans to release the Color Classics officially to DVD or Blu-Ray.

During 2003, animation archivist Jerry Beck conceived a definitive DVD box set of all the Color Classics, excluding The Tears of an Onion, and tried to enlist Republic Pictures' help in releasing this set.  After being refused, Kit Parker Films (in association with VCI Entertainment) offered to provide the best available 35mm and 16mm prints of the Color Classics from Parker's archives to create the box set Somewhere in Dreamland: The Max Fleischer Color Classics.  These "interim restored versions" contain digitally recreated Paramount titles; the U.M. & M.-modified prints had to have their title cards as well as their animator credits redone. The Tears of an Onion was not included in the set, as it remains copyrighted by Republic successor Melange Pictures.

Finally, in 2021, after decades of being shown in altered, worn, and “beet-red” prints, the Fleischer estate (in co-operation with Paramount Pictures) launched an initiative to formally restore the entire classic animation library from the surviving original negatives, beginning with Somewhere In Dreamland, which has had its restored World Premiere on the MeTV network in December of said year as part of the Toon In With Me Christmas special, presented uncut with its original front-and-end Paramount titles.

Filmography
Many of the cartoons do not have recurring characters, but Poor Cinderella featured Betty Boop, and some featured Newlyweds, and Tommy Cod. Towards the end Hunky and Spunky were featured characters.

All cartoons released during 1934 and 1935 were produced in two-strip Technicolor, except for Poor Cinderella which was produced in Cinecolor. All shorts from 1936 and onward were produced in three-strip Technicolor.

See also
Phantasies
Noveltoons
Modern Madcaps
Animated Antics
 Cartune Classics
 ComiColor Cartoons
 Happy Harmonies
 Merrie Melodies
 Rainbow Parade
 Silly Symphonies
 Swing Symphony
 Puppetoons
 Color Rhapsody

Notes

References

General
 Barrier, Michael (1999). Hollywood Cartoons: American Animation in Its Golden Age. Oxford: Oxford University Press. .
 Maltin, Leonard (1980, rev. 1987). Of Mice and Magic: A History of American Animated Cartoons. Penguin Books. .

External links
 

Fleischer Studios short films
Television series by U.M. & M. TV Corporation
Film series introduced in 1934
 
American animation anthology series
Paramount Pictures short films
Animated film series
Anthology film series